Anders Stig Thomas Bellbring (born 4 June 1952) is a retired Swedish swimmer. He won a bronze medal in the 4 × 200 m freestyle relay at the 1974 European Aquatics Championships. He also competed at the 1972 and 1976 Summer Olympics in seven freestyle and butterfly events, with distances ranging from 100 to 1500 m in the 1972 Games. His best achievement was the fourth place in the 4 × 200 m freestyle relay in 1972.

References

1952 births
Swimmers at the 1972 Summer Olympics
Swimmers at the 1976 Summer Olympics
Swedish male freestyle swimmers
Olympic swimmers of Sweden
Living people
European Aquatics Championships medalists in swimming
Sportspeople from Uppsala